Andrew Seaton (born 16 September 1977) is a Scottish former footballer, who played as a defender for Falkirk, Alloa Athletic and Berwick Rangers.

References

1977 births
Living people
Scottish footballers
Falkirk F.C. players
Alloa Athletic F.C. players
Berwick Rangers F.C. players
Scottish Football League players
Scotland under-21 international footballers
Association football fullbacks
Stoneyburn F.C. players
Penicuik Athletic F.C. players
Footballers from Edinburgh